The futsal tournament at the 2011 Southeast Asian Games took place from 17 to 22 November 2011.  This edition of the tournament featured both men's and women's tournaments.  All matches were held in POPKI Sports Hall, Jakarta.

Men's Tournament 
All times are Western Indonesian Time (WIB) – UTC+7.

Group stage

Group A

Group B

Knockout stage

Semi-finals

Bronze medal match

Gold medal match

Winners

Goalscorers 
8 goals
 Suphawut Thueanklang

7 goals
 Jetsada Chudech

5 goals
 Hairul
 Kritsada Wongkaeo

4 goals
 Apiwat Chaemcharoen
 Lertchai Issarasuwipakorn

3 goals

 Muhd Ali Mahat
 Ariel Zerrudo
 Sermphan Khumthinkaew
 Luu Quynh Toan
 Nguyen Hoang Giang

2 goals

 Indra Purnomo
 Jaelani Ladjanibi
 Misagh Bahadoran
 Nattaphon Suttiroj
 Nattawut Madyalan
 Nguyen Bao Quan
 Phung Trong Luan
 Tran Hoang Vinh

1 goal

 Afif Tamimy
 Angga Surya Saputra
 Sayan Karmadi
 Stefanus Home
 Vennard Hutabarat
 Afif Najmi Muhamad Izwan
 Mohd Asmie Amir Zahari
 Abu Haniffa Hasan
 Khairul Rizuan Harif Pagilah
 Muizzudin Mohd Haris
 Qaiser Heshaam Abdul Kadir
 Aung Aung
 Pyae Phyo Maung
 Htein Tin
 Eddie Mallari
 Jirawat Sornwichian
 Panomkorn Saisorn
 Panuwat Janta
 Hoang Vinh Tran
 Nguyen Quoc Bao
 Nguyen Thien Trong

Own goal

 Hairul Ohorella (For Thailand)
 Socrates Matulessy (For Malaysia)
 Than Wunna Aung (For Thailand)
 Aung Thu (For Thailand)
 Panuwat Janta (For Indonesia)

Women's Tournament 
All times are Western Indonesian Time (WIB) – UTC+7.

Group stage

Gold medal match

Winners

Goalscorers 
12 goals
 Orathai Srimanee

7 goals
 Aye Nandar Hlaing
 Khin Mar Lar Tun

6 goals
 Darika Peanpailun

5 goals
 Nipaporn Sriwarom

4 goals

 Rani Sari
 Honey Thomason
 Trinh Ngoc Hoa

3 goals

 Maulina Novryliani
 Novita Murni Piranti
 San San Maw
 Sasicha Phothiwong
 Nguyen Thi Thanh
 Tran Thi Thuy Trang

2 goals

 Hathaichok Tappakun
 Jiraprapa Nimrattanasing
 Prapasporn Sriroj
 Nguyen Thi Chau

1 goal

 Unknown
 Retno Ayu Dwi Wahyuningsih
 Mu Mu Lwin
 Jocelyn Guico
 Karla Pacificador
 Richelle Placencia
 Cristine Zacarias
 Pisayaporn Mokthaisong
 Jiraprapa Tupsuri
 Phan Le Ai Duyen
 Nguyen Thi Duyen
 Vo Thi Thuy Trinh

Own goal

 Rani Sari (For Vietnam)
 Aye Nandar Hlaing (For Vietnam)
 San San Maw (For Thailand)
 Nipaporn Sriwarom (For Myanmar)

Medal winners

References 

International futsal competitions hosted by Indonesia
2011 Southeast Asian Games events
Futsal at the Southeast Asian Games
South